Grimké is a surname. Notable people with the surname include John Faucheraud Grimké of South Carolina and six of his descendants:

 John Faucheraud Grimké (1752–1819)
 Sarah Moore Grimké (1792–1873)
 Angelina Emily Grimké (1805–1879)
 Charlotte Forten Grimké (1837–1914))
 Archibald Henry Grimké (1849–1930)
 Francis James Grimké (1852–1937)
 Angelina Weld Grimké (1880–1958)
 Grimké sisters, Sarah Moore Grimké and Angelina Emily Grimké jointly

See also
 Charlotte Forten Grimké House
 Grimke (crater), Venusian feature named to honour Sarah Moore Grimké
 Justice Grimke (disambiguation)